The Texas Heart Institute is an independent, nonprofit organization that is improving cardiovascular health through trailblazing research, thought leadership, education, and patient care to forge a better future for those with cardiovascular disease—a future with an increased focus on preventive cardiology. 

Located within the  Texas Medical Center in Houston, Texas,  and founded in 1962 by renowned cardiac surgeon Dr. Denton A. Cooley, The Texas Heart Institute performed the first successful heart transplant and total artificial heart implant in the United States. Its physicians and surgeons remain recognized as worldwide leaders in the diagnosis and treatment of even the most complex cardiovascular conditions performing more than 118,800 open heart operations, 258,000 cardiac catheterizations, and 1,500 heart transplants, and The Texas Heart Institute at Baylor St. Luke’s Medical Center has been ranked among the top cardiovascular centers in the United States by U.S. News & World Report for more than 30 years.  

Today The Institute is led by Dr. Joseph G. Rogers, an internationally recognized cardiologist and highly published thought leader in heart transplantation and mechanically assisted circulation.

References 

Heart disease organizations
Institutions in the Texas Medical Center